In chemistry, a chemical transport reaction describes a process for purification and crystallization of non-volatile solids.  The process is also responsible for certain aspects of mineral growth from the effluent of volcanoes.  The technique is distinct from chemical vapor deposition, which usually entails decomposition of molecular precursors  and which gives conformal coatings.
The technique, which was popularized by Harald Schäfer, entails the reversible conversion of nonvolatile elements and chemical compounds into volatile derivatives.  The volatile derivative migrates throughout a sealed reactor, typically a sealed and evacuated glass tube heated in a tube furnace.  Because the tube is under a temperature gradient, the volatile derivative reverts to the parent solid and the transport agent is released at the end opposite to which it originated (see next section).  The transport agent is thus catalytic.  The technique requires that the two ends of the tube (which contains the sample to be crystallized) be maintained at different temperatures.  So-called two-zone tube furnaces are employed for this purpose. The method derives from the Van Arkel de Boer process which was used for the purification of titanium and vanadium and uses iodine as the transport agent.

Cases of the exothermic and endothermic reactions of the transporting agent
Transport reactions are classified according to the thermodynamics of the reaction between the solid and the transporting agent.  When the reaction is exothermic, then the solid of interest is transported from the cooler end (which can be quite hot) of the reactor to a hot end, where the equilibrium constant is less favorable and the crystals grow.  The reaction of molybdenum dioxide with the transporting agent iodine is an exothermic process, thus the MoO2 migrates from the cooler end (700 °C) to the hotter end (900 °C):
MoO2  +  I2    MoO2I2  ΔHrxn < 0 (exothermic)
Using 10 milligrams of iodine for 4 grams of the solid, the process requires several days.  

Alternatively, when the reaction of the solid and the transport agent is endothermic, the solid is transported from a hot zone to a cooler one. For example:
Fe2O3  +  6 HCl    Fe2Cl6+ 3 H2O  ΔHrxn > 0 (endothermic)
The sample of iron(III) oxide is maintained at 1000 °C, and the product is grown at 750 °C.  HCl is the transport agent.  Crystals of hematite are reportedly observed at the mouths of volcanoes because of chemical transport reactions whereby volcanic hydrogen chloride volatilizes iron(III) oxides.

Halogen lamp
A similar reaction like that of MoO2 is used in halogen lamps. The tungsten is evaporated from the tungsten filament and converted with traces of oxygen and iodine into the WO2I2, at the high temperatures near the filament the compound decomposes back to tungsten, oxygen and iodine. 

WO2  +  I2    WO2I2,  ΔHrxn < 0 (exothermic)

References

Inorganic chemistry
Solid-state chemistry